Nicholas Shaw (born 1982) is an English actor. He attended McAuley Catholic High School in Doncaster. He then attended the Drama Centre London and graduated in 2004.

Television and films
Shaw first gained attention in the lead role of Doug in The Rotters Club, the TV series based on Jonathan Coe’s novel, broadcast in 2004. He played guest roles in other TV series, Dalziel & Pascoe, Heartbeat and Afterlife, and appeared as the poet, John Keats in The Romantics.

He was Justin, one of the lead roles, in the eight-part TV series, Goldplated, in 2006, and played the lead in the 2007 TV film, All About Me, co-starring with Phoebe Nicholls, Danny Webb and Phil Davis. In 2008, he played Sandoval in an episode of Heroes and Villains about Hernán Cortés. In 2010 played a role in the "shockumentary" The Possession of David O'Reilly. Between 2010 and 2012, he played John Fisher in the BBC series "Land Girls".

Theatre
In 2005, Shaw played Benjamin in the UK tour of Oxford Stage Company’s production of Gregory Moton’s translation of August Strindberg’s Easter, directed by Dominic Dromgoole. The following year, his performance earned him a commendation in the annual Ian Charleson Awards.

In summer 2007, Shaw appeared in two productions at Shakespeare's Globe theatre: The Merchant of Venice, alongside John McEnery and Jack Shepherd’s new play, Holding Fire!, which saw Shaw reunited with Dominic Dromgoole as director. In summer 2008, he played Romeo in Romeo and Juliet and Lysander in Twelfth Night, both at the Open Air Theatre, London.

He played the title role in the Northern Broadsides production of Hamlet in 2011, receiving critical acclaim. "Like the production itself, he is daringly theatrical and heartbreakingly human", said The Observer.

In March 2012, Shaw played the central character, Misail Alexandrovich Polznev, in Peter Gill's adaptation of Chekhov's 'A Provincial Life', at the National Theatre Wales, Cardiff. He plays a young man who rejects his inheritance as the son of an architect. He adopts the life of a workman before moving to the country to run a school on the estate of the higher-born, dilettante wife, Marie, who eventually deserts him.

In February 2013 he returned to Northern Broadsides to play John in their acclaimed production of Githa Sowerby's 'Rutherford and Son'. With adaptations by Blake Morrison the production toured across the length and breadth of Britain before finishing at St James Theatre, London in June.

References

External links

Alumni of the Drama Centre London
English male stage actors
English male television actors
English male Shakespearean actors
1982 births
Living people